Cristian Trombetta (born October 15, 1986 in Rancul, La Pampa) is an Argentine footballer currently plying for US Anconitana in Italy.

Career

Trombetta began his playing career with Nueva Chicago in the Argentine 2nd division. The club was promoted to the Primera División in 2006, but relegated the following season after losing an end of season playoff. The club began the new 2nd division season with an 18-point deduction due to violence following their relegation and was consequently relegated to the regionalised 3rd division. After one season playing in the 3rd tier of Argentine football Trombetta joined Leixões S.C. of Portugal.

Trombetta returned to Argentina in 2010 to play for Tigre in the top tier. He subsequently signed for Arsenal de Sarandí in 2011.

Honours
Arsenal
Argentine Primera División (1): 2012 Clausura

References

External links
 Profile at playerhistory.com
 BDFA profile 
 Argentine Primera statistics at Fútbol XXI  
 

1986 births
Living people
People from La Pampa Province
Argentine footballers
Argentine expatriate footballers
Association football defenders
Nueva Chicago footballers
Leixões S.C. players
Chiapas F.C. footballers
Club Atlético Tigre footballers
Arsenal de Sarandí footballers
CSyD Tristán Suárez footballers
Argentine Primera División players
Primeira Liga players
Liga MX players
Expatriate footballers in Mexico
Expatriate footballers in Paraguay
Expatriate footballers in Portugal